Henry Nichols may refer to:

Henry E. Nichols (died 1899), U.S. Navy officer and the commander of the Department of Alaska
Henry F. C. Nichols (1833–1890), American politician
Henry L. Nichols (1823–1915), American physician and Democratic politician from California
Hobart Nichols (Henry Hobart Nichols, Jr., 1869–1962), American landscape painter and illustrator

See also

 Harry Sidney Nichols (died 1939),  antiquarian book dealer and publisher and printer of high-end erotica
Henry Nicols (1973–2000), haemophiliac who became a campaigner for fellow AIDS victims
Henry Nicholls (disambiguation)